Josef John Bursik (born 12 July 2000) is an English professional footballer who plays as a goalkeeper for Club Brugge.

Club career

Stoke City 
Bursik began his career at the youth academy at AFC Wimbledon, where he spent eight years before joining Stoke City on 1 July 2017. Bursik spent time on loan at Hednesford Town and AFC Telford United. On 2 August 2019, Bursik joined EFL League One side Accrington Stanley on loan for the 2019–20 season. Bursik made his Accrington Stanley debut on 29 October 2019 in the EFL Trophy. He made his League debut on 14 December 2019 in a 4–1 victory against Portsmouth. Bursik signed a new three-and-a-half-year contract with Stoke in January 2020. Bursik played 20 matches for Stanley in 2019–20 until the season was ended early due to the COVID-19 pandemic at the time Accrington were in 17th position.

In August 2020 Bursik joined Doncaster Rovers on loan for the 2020–21 season. After making 11 appearances for Doncaster, he was recalled by Stoke on 19 November 2020 following injuries to Adam Davies and Angus Gunn. Bursik made his Stoke debut on 21 November 2020 in a 4–3 win against Huddersfield Town. Bursik made 16 appearances for Stoke from November 2020 until January 2021 and kept seven clean sheets. Bursik joined Peterborough United on 8 April 2021 in an emergency loan deal following a season ending injury to Christy Pym. He made six appearances for Peterborough, helping them to gain promotion to the Championship. On 18 May 2021 Bursik joined Lincoln City on an emergency loan for their League One play-offs following a head injury to Alex Palmer. He played in the first leg a 2–0 win against Sunderland before Palmer was cleared to return. Bursik began the 2021–22 season as Stoke's first choice goalkeeper until he suffered a quad muscle injury with England U21s in November 2021. His place was taken by Jack Bonham until he returned to the team towards the end of the season.

Club Brugge 
On 14 January 2023, Bursik signed for Belgian Pro League club Club Brugge for an undisclosed fee.

International career
Bursik was the starting goalkeeper for the England Under-17 team that lost to Spain on a penalty shoot-out in the final of the 2017 UEFA European Under-17 Championship. He was also a member of the squad that won the 2017 FIFA U-17 World Cup.

Having gone on to represent England at U18, U19 and U20 level, Bursik made his U21 debut during a 5–0 win over Albania at Molineux Stadium on 17 November 2020.

Personal life
Bursik is named after his grandfather Josef Buršík, a Czech war hero. Bursik's father, Alex, died in September 2022.

Career statistics

Honours
England U17
FIFA U-17 World Cup: 2017
UEFA European Under-17 Championship runner-up: 2017

References

2000 births
Living people
English footballers
Association football goalkeepers
Footballers from Lambeth
AFC Wimbledon players
Stoke City F.C. players
Hednesford Town F.C. players
AFC Telford United players
Accrington Stanley F.C. players
Doncaster Rovers F.C. players
Peterborough United F.C. players
Northern Premier League players
National League (English football) players
England youth international footballers
England under-21 international footballers
English Football League players
English people of Czech descent
Club Brugge KV players
English expatriate footballers
English expatriate sportspeople in Belgium